The 2018–19 Burger King Super Smash (named after the competition's sponsor Burger King) was the fourteenth season of the Men's Super Smash Twenty20 cricket tournament in New Zealand. It took place from 22 December 2018 to 17 February 2019. Northern Knights were the defending champions.

On 1 January 2019, in the match between Auckland Aces and Canterbury Kings, Canterbury's Kyle Jamieson took the best figures by a bowler in a T20 match in New Zealand, and the third-best figures ever, when he took six wickets for seven runs from his four overs.

On 25 January 2019, Northern Knights were the first team to reach the final of the tournament, after they beat Central Stags by 131 runs, securing a home final in the process. On 2 February 2019, the Auckland Aces beat the Northern Knights by six wickets to confirm their spot in the playoffs. The Central Stags became the third and final team to reach the playoffs. In the Preliminary Final, Central Stags beat Auckland Aces by 44 runs to progress to the final.

In the final, Central Stags beat the defending champions, Northern Knights, by 67 runs to win their third title.

Round-robin

Points table

 Advanced to the Final
 Advanced to the Preliminary Final

Fixtures

Finals

References

External links
 Series home at ESPN Cricinfo

2018–19 New Zealand cricket season
Super Smash
Super Smash (cricket)